The Incredible Sarah is a 1976 British drama film directed by Richard Fleischer and starring Glenda Jackson.  It presents a dramatization of the acting career of Sarah Bernhardt.

Cast
 Glenda Jackson as Sarah Bernhardt
 Daniel Massey as Victorien Sardou
 Yvonne Mitchell as Mam'selle
 Douglas Wilmer as Montigny
 David Langton as Duc De Morny
 Simon Williams as Henri de Ligne
 John Castle as Damala
 Edward Judd as Jarrett
 Rosemarie Dunham as Mrs. Bernhardt
 Peter Sallis as Thierry
 Bridget Armstrong as Marie
 Margaret Courtenay as Madame Nathalie
 Maxwell Shaw as Fadinard
 Patrick Newell as Major
 Neil McCarthy as Sergeant

Awards
The film was nominated for two Academy Awards for Best Costume Design (Anthony Mendleson) and Best Art Direction (Elliot Scott and Norman Reynolds). Glenda Jackson was also nominated for a Golden Globe Award for Best Actress.

References

External links

1976 films
1970s biographical drama films
Biographical films about actors
British biographical drama films
Films scored by Elmer Bernstein
Films directed by Richard Fleischer
Films shot at Pinewood Studios
Cultural depictions of Sarah Bernhardt
1976 drama films
1970s English-language films
1970s British films